Coimbatore, also spelt as Koyamputhur, sometimes shortened as Kovai, is one of the major metropolitan cities in the Indian state of Tamil Nadu. It is located on the banks of the Noyyal River and surrounded by the Western Ghats. Coimbatore is the second largest city in Tamil Nadu after Chennai in terms of population and the 16th largest urban agglomeration in India as per the census 2011. It is administered by the Coimbatore Municipal Corporation and is the administrative capital of Coimbatore District. In 1981, Coimbatore formed as the third municipal corporation in Tamil Nadu after Chennai and Madurai. Podanur Junction is the oldest railway station in Coimbatore City. The city is one of the largest exporters of jewellery, wet grinders, poultry and auto components; the "Coimbatore Wet Grinder" and the "Kovai Cora Cotton" are recognised as Geographical Indications by the Government of India. Being a hub of textile industry in South India, the city is sometimes referred to as the "Manchester of South India". It was ranked the 7th best city in India in the Ease of Living index 2020.

The region around Coimbatore was ruled by the Cheras during the Sangam period between the 1st and the 4th centuries CE and it served as the eastern entrance to the Palakkad Gap, the principal trade route between the west coast and Tamil Nadu. Coimbatore was located along the ancient trade route Rajakesari Peruvazhi that extended from Muziris to Arikamedu in South India. The medieval Cholas conquered the Kongu Nadu in the 10th century CE. The region was ruled by Vijayanagara Empire in the 15th century followed by the Nayaks who introduced the Palayakkarar system under which Kongu Nadu region was divided into 24 Palayams. In the later part of the 18th century, the Coimbatore region came under the Kingdom of Mysore and following the defeat of Tipu Sultan in the Anglo-Mysore Wars, the British East India Company annexed Coimbatore to the Madras Presidency in 1799. The Coimbatore region played a prominent role in the Second Poligar War (1801) when it was the area of operations of Dheeran Chinnamalai.

In 1804, Coimbatore was established as the capital of the newly formed Coimbatore district and in 1866, it was accorded municipality status with Robert Stanes as its chairman. 24 November used to be Coimbatore Day, say those familiar with the history of Coimbatore. The city experienced a textile boom in the early 19th century due to the decline of the cotton industry in Mumbai. Post – Independence, Coimbatore has seen rapid growth due to industrialisation including the introduction of 3 malls in major locations. Coimbatore was ranked the best emerging city in India by India Today in the 2014 annual Indian city survey. The city was ranked fourth among Indian cities in investment climate by Confederation of Indian Industry and 17th among the top global outsourcing cities by Tholons. Coimbatore has been selected as one of the hundred Indian cities to be developed as a smart city under Prime Minister Narendra Modi's flagship Smart Cities Mission. Coimbatore regularly features among the top 10 best cities to live in India. Coimbatore was rated as one of the safest cities in India for women according to National Crime Records Bureau report in 2015.

Etymology 
There are multiple theories regarding the origin of the name Coimbatore. According to one theory, "Coimbatore" is a derivation of Kovanpudhur (literally 'new town of Kovan'), after chieftain Kovan or Koyan, evolved into Koyampuththoor and later anglicised as Coimbatore. Koyamma, the goddess worshipped by Koyan evolved into Koniamma and later Kovaiamma. Another theory states that the name could have been derived from Kovaiamma.

History 

The region around Coimbatore was ruled by the Cheras during Sangam period between c. 1st and the 4th centuries CE and it served as the eastern entrance to the Palakkad Gap, the principal trade route between the west coast and Tamil Nadu. The Kosar tribe mentioned in the 2nd century CE Tamil epic Silappathikaram and other poems in Sangam literature is associated with the Coimbatore region. The region was located along an ancient Roman trade route that extended from Muziris to Arikamedu. The medieval Cholas conquered the Kongu Nadu in the 10th century. A Chola highway called Rajakesari Peruvazhi ran through the region. Much of Tamil Nadu came under the rule of the Vijayanagara Empire by the 15th century. In the 1550s, Madurai Nayaks, who were the military governors of the Vijaynagara Empire, took control of the region. After the Vijayanagara Empire fell in the 17th century, the Madurai Nayaks established their state as an independent kingdom. They introduced the Palayakkarar system under which Kongu Nadu region was divided into 24 Palayams(towns).

In the latter part of the 18th century, the region came under the Kingdom of Mysore, following a series of wars with the Madurai Nayak dynasty. After the defeat of Tipu Sultan in the Anglo-Mysore Wars, the British East India Company annexed Coimbatore to the Madras Presidency in 1799. The Coimbatore region played a prominent role in the Second Poligar War (1801), when it was the area of operations of Dheeran Chinnamalai. In 1804, Coimbatore was established as the capital of the newly formed Coimbatore district and in 1866 it was accorded municipality status. Sir Robert Stanes became the first chairman of the Coimbatore City Council. The region was hard hit during the Great Famine of 1876–78 resulting in nearly 200,000 famine related fatalities. The first three decades of the 20th century saw nearly 20,000 plague-related deaths and acute water shortage.

The decline of the cotton industry in Mumbai fuelled an economic boom in Coimbatore in the 1920s and 1930s. The region played a significant role in the Indian independence movement with Mahatma Gandhi visiting the city three times. Coimbatore was the base of operations for such political figures as S. P. Narasimhalu Naidu, R. K. Shanmukham Chetty, C.S. Rathinasabapathy and C. Subramaniam during the independence movement. Post independence, Coimbatore has seen rapid growth due to industrialisation and in 1981 it was constituted as a municipal corporation. On 14 February 1998, the radical Islamist group Al Ummah bombed 11 places across the city killing 58 people and injuring more than 200.

Geography 

It is surrounded by the Western Ghats mountain range to the west and the north, with reserve forests of the Nilgiri Biosphere Reserve on the northern side. The Noyyal River forms the southern boundary of the city, which has an extensive tank system fed by the river and rainwater. The eight major tanks and wetland areas of Coimbatore are namely, Singanallur, Valankulam, Ukkadam Periyakulam, Selvampathy, Narasampathi, Krishnampathi, Selvachinthamani, and Kumaraswami. Multiple streams drain the waste water from the city.

The city is divided into two distinctive geographic regions: the dry eastern side which includes majority of the urban area of the city and the western region which borders the Nilgiris, Anaimalai and Munnar ranges. Palghat Gap, a mountain pass which connects the neighbouring state of Kerala to Tamil Nadu, lies to the west of the city. Because of its location in the biodiversity hotspot of the Western Ghats, a UNESCO World Heritage Site, the city is rich in fauna and flora. The Coimbatore urban wetlands harbours around 116 species of birds, of which 66 are resident, 17 are migratory and 33 are local migrants. The spot-billed pelican, painted stork, openbill stork, ibis, Indian spot-billed duck, teal and black-winged stilt visit the Coimbatore wetlands on their migration. Apart from the species common to the plains, various threatened and endangered species such as Indian elephants, wild boars, leopards, Bengal tigers, gaurs, Nilgiri tahr, sloth bear and black-headed oriole are found in the region.

The northern part of the city has a rich tropical evergreen forest with commercially significant trees such as teak, sandalwood, rosewood and bamboo. The soil is predominantly black, which is suitable for cotton cultivation, but some red loamy soil is also found. According to the Bureau of Indian Standards, Coimbatore falls under the Class III/IV Seismic Zone, having experienced an earthquake of magnitude 6.0 on the Richter scale on 8 February 1900.

Climate 
Under the Köppen climate classification, the city has a hot semi-arid climate (BSh), with a wet season lasting from September to November due to the northeast monsoon.

Coimbatore has a tropical wet and dry climate. It experiences hot and humid summers from March to June with temperatures ranging from 25°C to 38°C. The monsoon season starts from July and lasts till October. The city receives moderate rainfall from the south-west monsoon and occasional heavy rainfall from the north-east monsoon. The winter season starts from November and ends in February. The temperatures during this season range from 20°C to 30°C.

Due to the south-west monsoon winds passing through the Palghat gap, elevated regions of the city receive rainfall in the months from June to August. After a warm and foggy September, the north-east monsoon starts from October, lasting until early November. This periodic rainfall does not satisfy the city's water requirements throughout the year and water supply schemes like Siruvani and Pilloor maintain its availability during low rainfall months.

Demographics 

Coimbatore has a population of 1,601,438. As per the 2011 census based on pre-expansion city limits, Coimbatore had a population of 1,050,721 with a sex ratio of 997 females for every 1,000 males, much above the national average of 929. It is the second largest city in the state after capital Chennai and the sixteenth largest urban agglomeration in India. A total of 102,069 were under the age of six, comprising 52,275 males and 49,794 females. The average literacy of the city was 82.43%, compared to the national average of 72.99%. There were a total of 425,115 workers, comprising 1,539 cultivators, 2,908 main agricultural labourer, 11,789 in house hold industries, 385,802 other workers, 23,077 marginal workers, 531 marginal cultivators, 500 marginal agricultural labourer, 1,169 marginal workers in household industries and 20,877 other marginal workers.

As per the 2001 census, Coimbatore had a population of 930,882 within the municipal corporation limits. The population of the urban agglomeration as per 2011 census is 2,136,916 with males constituting 50.08% of the population and females 49.92%. Coimbatore has an average literacy rate of 89.23%, higher than the national average of 74.04%. Male literacy is 93.17% and female literacy is 85.3% with 8.9% of the population under six years of age. The sex ratio was 964 females per 1000 males. In 2005, the crime rate in the city was 265.9 per 100,000 people, accounting for 1.2% of all crimes reported in major cities in India. It ranked 21st among 35 major cities in India in the incidence of crimes. In 2011, the population density in the city was 10,052 per km2 (26,035 per mi2). Around 8% of the city's population lives in slums.

Administration and politics 

Coimbatore is a municipal corporation administered by the Coimbatore Municipal Corporation and is the administrative headquarters of Coimbatore district. Coimbatore was established as the capital of Coimbatore district in 1804 and in 1866, it was accorded municipality status. In 1981, Coimbatore was elevated as a municipal corporation. The city is divided into five administrative zones – East, West, North, South and Central, each further subdivided into 20 wards. Each ward is represented by a councillor who is elected by direct election and the Mayor of Coimbatore is elected by Councillors. The executive wing of the corporation is headed by a Corporation Commissioner and maintains basic services like water supply, sewage and roads. The district itself is administered by the district collector and the district court in Coimbatore is the highest court of appeal in the district. The Coimbatore City Police is headed by a Commissioner of Police and there are 18 police stations in the city.

A large part of the Coimbatore urban agglomeration falls outside the Municipal corporation limits. These suburbs are governed by local bodies called Village Panchayats and Town Panchayats.
Besides the Coimbatore Municipal Corporation, the Coimbatore urban agglomeration comprises the Town Panchayats of Vellalur, Irugur, Pallapalayam, Kannampalayam, Veerapandi, Periyanaickenpalayam, Narasimhanaickenpalayam, Idikarai, Vedapatti, Perur, Madukkarai, Ettimadai, Thondamuthur, Uliyampalayam, Thirumalayampalayam, Othakalmandapam, Alanthurai, Pooluvapatti, Thenkarai, Karumathampatti, Sarcarsamakulam, Mopperipalayam and Gudalur, census towns of Ashokapuram, Kurudampalayam, Malumichampatti, Selvapuram, Chettipalayam, Sulur, Chinniampalayam, Somayampalayam, Muthugoundan Pudur, Arasur, Kaniyur, Neelambur and municipalities of Kuniyamuthur, Kurichi and Goundampalayam. These local bodies are in turn split into wards each electing a councillor through direct election. The head of the local body, known as the President, is elected by the councillors from among their number.

Coimbatore has traditionally been a stronghold of the Dravidian party All India Anna Dravida Munnetra Kazhagam (AIADMK) with national parties such as the Bharatiya Janata Party (BJP) as well as the Communist Party of India (Marxist) (CPI(M)) also having a significant presence. The city elects ten members to the Tamil Nadu Legislative Assembly and one member to the Indian Parliament. The six legislative assembly constituencies in the city are Coimbatore North, Coimbatore South, Kaundampalayam, Singanallur and Thondamuthur and Kinathukadavu which form a part of the Coimbatore Parliamentary Constituency. Part of the urban agglomeration comes under the Nilgiris and Pollachi constituencies. In the Indian general election held in 2019, CPI (M) candidate P.R. Natarajan defeated C. P. Radhakrishnan of the BJP in the Lok Sabha constituency. In the last legislative assembly election held in 2021, the AIADMK led front won in all five assembly constituencies.

Economy 

A major hub for manufacturing, education and healthcare in Tamil Nadu, Coimbatore is among the fastest growing tier-II cities in India. It houses more than 25,000 small, medium and large industries with the primary industries being engineering and textiles. Coimbatore is called the "Manchester of South India" due to its extensive textile industry, fed by the surrounding cotton fields. TIDEL Park Coimbatore in ELCOT SEZ was the first special economic zone (SEZ) set up in 2006. In 2010, Coimbatore ranked 15th in the list of most competitive (by business environment) Indian cities. Coimbatore also has a  trade fair ground, built in 1999 and is owned by CODISSIA.

Coimbatore region experienced a textile boom in the 1920s and 1930s. Though, Robert Stanes had established Coimbatore's first textile mills as early as the late 19th century, it was during this period that Coimbatore emerged as a prominent industrial centre. In 2009 Coimbatore was home to around 15% of the cotton spinning capacity in India. Coimbatore has trade associations such as CODISSIA, COINDIA and COJEWEL representing the industries in the city. Coimbatore houses a number of textile mills and is the base of textile research institutes like the Sardar Vallabhbhai Patel International School of Textiles & Management, Central Institute for Cotton Research (CICR) and the South India Textile Research Institute (SITRA). Kovai Cora Cotton saree is a recognised Geographical Indication.

Coimbatore is the second largest producer of software in the state, next to capital Chennai. TIDEL Park Coimbatore and other Information technology parks in the city has aided in the growth of IT and Business process outsourcing industries in the city. It is ranked at 17th among the top global outsourcing cities by Tholons. Coimbatore has a large and diversified manufacturing sector and a number of engineering colleges producing about 50,000 engineers annually. Due to huge demand from IT Companies for space at Coimbatore, TIDEL Park Coimbatore-Phase-II is planned to be built within ELCOT SEZ on an additional 9 acres of land with 5 Lakh sq.feet space at ₹ 250 crores. TICEL Bio-Park III, a Bio-Technology Park is being constructed in 10 acres of land at Somayampalayam, Coimbatore.

Coimbatore is a major centre for the manufacture of automotive components in India with car manufacturers Maruti Udyog and Tata Motors sourcing up to 30%, of their automotive components from the city. G.D. Naidu developed India's first indigenous motor in 1937. India's first indigenously developed diesel engine for cars was manufactured in the city in 1972. The city is also a major centre for small auto component makers catering to the automobile industry, from personal to commercial and farm vehicles. The city contributes to about 75% of the 1 lakh total monthly output of wet grinders in India. The term "Coimbatore Wet Grinder" has been given a Geographical indication.

Coimbatore is also referred to as "the Pump City" as it supplies nearly 50% of India's requirements of motors and pumps. Coimbatores largest pump manufacturer CRI pumps, contributes a lot towards the "pump city" status of coimbatore. The city is one of the largest exporters of jewellery renowned for diamond cutting, cast and machine made jewellery. There are about 3,000 jewellery manufacturers employing over 40,000 goldsmiths.

Coimbatore has a large number of poultry farms and is a major producer of chicken eggs. The city contributes to nearly 95% of processed chicken meat exports. Coimbatore has some of the country's oldest flour mills and these mills which cater to all the southern states, have a combined grinding capacity of more than 50,000 MT per month. The hospitality industry has seen a growth in the 21st century with new upscale hotels being set up. Coimbatore is the largest non-metro city for e-commerce in South India.

Culture 
  Coimbatore and its people have a reputation for entrepreneurship. Though it is generally considered a traditional city, Coimbatore is diverse and cosmopolitan. The World Classical Tamil Conference 2010 was held in Coimbatore. The heavy industrialisation of the city has also resulted in the growth of trade unions.

Language 
Tamil is the official language and Kongu Tamil (also called Kangee or Kongalam), a dialect, is predominantly spoken. Coimbatore also has a significant number of Telugus, Kannada, Malayalis, and North Indians, mainly Gujaratis. As per the 2011 census, Tamil is the most spoken language with 710,326 speakers, followed by Telugu (173,136),
Kannada (102,000), Malayalam (76,485). Other languages spoken in the city include Urdu (15,484) and Hindi (13,608). During the 1970s the city witnessed a population explosion as a result of migration fuelled by increased economic growth and job opportunities.

Religion 

The city's population is predominantly Hindu with minority Muslim and Christian population. Jains, Sikhs and Buddhists are also present in small numbers. According to the religious census of 2011, Coimbatore has 83.31% Hindus, 8.63% Muslims, 7.53% Christians, 0.28% Jains, 0.05% Sikhs, 0.02% Buddhists and 0.01% Others. 0.17% of the respondents did not state their religion.

The Mariamman festivals at the city's numerous Mariamman temples are major events in summer. Major Hindu temples in the city include the Perur Patteeswarar Temple, Naga Sai Mandir, Koniamman Temple, Thandu Mariamman Temple, Eachanari Vinayagar Temple, Karamadai Ranganathaswamy Temple, Marudamalai Murugan Temple, Loga Nayaga Shaniswara Temple, Ashtamsa Varadha Anjaneyar Temple, Masani Amman Temple. The mosques on Oppanakara Street and Big Bazaar Street date back to the 18th century CE. Christian missions date back to the 17th century when permission was granted by the Nayak rulers to set up churches in the region. Sikh Gurudwaras and Jain temples are also present in Coimbatore.

Cuisine 

Coimbatore cuisine is predominantly south Indian with rice as its base. Most local restaurants still retain their rural flavor, with many restaurants serving food over a banana leaf. Eating on a banana leaf is an old custom and imparts a unique flavor to the food and is considered healthy. North Indian, Chinese and continental cuisines are also available. Idly, dosa, paniyaram and appam are popular dishes.

Coimbatore has an active street food culture and various cuisine options for dining. Arisi paruppu sadam and sambar sadam, made from a mixture of dal and rice, is a recipe that existed from the 4th century CE that is unique to the area. Ariseemparuppu or arisi paruppu satham (literally translated as Rice and dal) originated from Coimbatore and the people of the city celebrate January 8 as national Aruseemparuppu day, after given light by a popular influencer and food consultant. Kaalaan is a popular dish prepared by simmering deep-fried mushrooms (usually chopped) in a spicy broth until it reaches a porridge-like consistency; the dish is served sprinkled with chopped onions and coriander leaves. Chaats made from potatoes and a mix of other vegetables and spices are also popular.

Arts 
Swamikannu Vincent, who had built the first cinema of south India in Coimbatore, introduced the concept of Tent Cinema in which a tent was erected on an open land to screen the films. Central Studios was set up in 1935 while S. M. Sriramulu Naidu established Pakshiraja Studios in 1945. The city conducts its own music festival every year. Art, dance and music concerts are held annually during the months of September and December (Tamil calendar month – Margazhi). Coimbatore also houses a number of museums and art galleries like G.D. Naidu Museum & Industrial Exhibition, H A Gass Forest Museum, Government Museum, Kadhi Gandhi Gallery and Kasthuri Srinivasan Art Gallery and Textile Museum.

Transport

Air 

The city is served by the Coimbatore International Airport at Peelamedu  from the city centre. The airport commenced operations in 1940 as a civil aerodrome with Indian Airlines operating Fokker F27, Douglas DC-3 and later Hawker Siddeley HS 748 aircraft. The then Prime Minister of India Manmohan Singh declared the government's intention to upgrade the Coimbatore Airport to International status in a meeting with senior ministers on 6 June 2012 and it was granted the status of international airport by the Union Cabinet on 2 October 2012. The airport is operated by Airports Authority of India and caters to domestic flights to major Indian cities and international flights to Sharjah, Singapore and Sri Lanka. -15, the airport was the 15th largest airport in India in terms of total aircraft movement, 18th largest in terms of passengers handled and 13th largest in terms of cargo handled. Air Carnival, a private airline commenced its operations in 2016 with the Coimbatore International Airport as its hub. PlanetX Aerospace operates private helicopter rides from Coimbatore to popular tourist hotspots nearby including Munnar in Kerala and Coorg in Karnataka. 

Sulur Air Force Station, located at Kangayampalayam is an air base operated by the Indian Air Force and accommodates Antonov An-32 heavy air lifter aircraft, Mil Mi-8 transport helicopters and the HAL Dhruv helicopters of the Sarang helicopter display team. The first squadron of ingeniously built HAL Tejas will be inducted at Sulur AFS and Sukhoi Su-30MKI aircraft were stationed at the base by 2016.

Rail 

Train service in Coimbatore started in 1861, upon the construction of the Podanur – Madras line connecting Kerala and the west coast with the rest of India. Coimbatore lies on the Coimbatore – Chennai  broad gauge railway line and the city falls under the Salem division of the Southern Railway zone of Indian Railways. The major railway station is the Coimbatore Junction which is the second-largest income generating station in the Southern Railway zone after Chennai Central and is amongst the top hundred booking stations of Indian Railways. Other major railway stations catering to the city include Coimbatore North Junction, Podanur Junction and minor stations at Peelamedu, Singanallur, Irugur Junction, Perianaikanpalayam, Madukkarai, Somanur and Sulur. The city is located near the railhead for the Nilgiri Mountain Railway, a UNESCO World heritage site and mountain railway which goes to the hill station of Ooty.

Metro rail 

The Central Government proposed a metro rail system for 16 tier-2 cities in India including Coimbatore in 2010. While the Government of Tamilnadu in 2011, shelved in favour of a monorail. Coimbatore Railway Struggle Committee has also protested to implement metro rail project in Coimbatore. In 2013, E. Sreedharan made survey and announced metro rail as suitable transport for Coimbatore

In 2017, the Tamil Nadu Government proposed a metro for the city of Coimbatore. The Systra group was involved to do the feasibility and finalize the routes in the proposed metro rail. The CMRL proposed five corridors in Coimbatore Metro.
Ukkadam Bus Terminus to Kaniyur
Ukkadam Bus Terminus to Bilichi
Karanampettai to Thaneer Panthal
Ganeshapuram to Karunya Nagar
Ukkadam Bus Terminus to Coimbatore Integrated Bus Terminus

Road 
There are six major arterial roads in the city: Avinashi Road, Trichy Road, Sathy Road, Mettupalayam Road, Palakkad Road, Pollachi Road and Thadagam Road. The Coimbatore bypass is a series of bypasses connecting the various National Highways and State Highways passing through and originating from Coimbatore. The first section of the bypass, a  stretch from Neelambur to Madukkarai on National Highway 544 opened for traffic in 2000. It was the first road privatisation project to be implemented on a build–operate–transfer model in South India. In 2008, the State Highways department came up with a proposal to create a Ring road to help de-congest the main arterial roads and the 12 km road would extend from Peelamedu to Mettupalayam road. In 2011, the Chief Minister of Tamil Nadu announced the construction of two new flyovers at Ukkadam and Athupalam to help de-congest the Palakkad Road. In 2012, the Government of Tamil Nadu decided in favour of an eastern road that connected Mettupalayam Road with Avinashi Road and the existing bypass. The city municipal corporation is undertaking the construction of six rail-over-bridges in the city. There are five National Highways passing through the city:

Bus 
Town buses started operating in 1921 and serve most parts of the city, as well as other towns and villages in the district. The number of inter-city routes operated by Coimbatore division is 119 with a fleet of more than 500 buses. It also operates town buses on 257 intra-city routes. The intra-city buses operate from major bus stations in Gandhipuram Central Bus Terminus, Singanallur Bus Terminus, Ukkadam Bus Terminus and Saibaba Colony Bus Terminus to other parts across the city. Inter-city and intra-city buses that connect Coimbatore operate from different bus stands:

The Coimbatore Integrated Bus Terminus planned at Vellalore is under construction. The proposed terminus will be built at a cost of  168 crores.

Coimbatore BRTS is a proposed bus rapid transit project under the JNNURM scheme of the Government of India. It is planned along a  stretch connecting Avinashi road and Mettupalayam road. The city is also served by auto rickshaws and radio taxi services like Uber, Ola Cabs, RedTaxi, GoTaxi, Zoomcar, Avis. Coimbatore has four Regional Transport Offices viz. TN 37 (South), TN 38 (North), TN 66 (Central), TN 99 (West).

Coimbatore to Chennai Bus route is very busy and there are buses plying at regular intervals. The distance between the two cities is approximately 500 km.

Education 

Coimbatore is a major educational hub. The earliest educational institutions established in the city date back to more than a century with C.S.I. Boys High School (1831), St. Michael's Higher Secondary School (1860), Stanes Anglo Indian Higher Secondary School (1862) and St. Francis Anglo-Indian Girls School (1898) being the oldest. In 1867, the first group of students appeared for the SSLC Examinations from Coimbatore.

The first college of Coimbatore, Government Arts College, was opened in 1875. The first engineering college in the city, the Arthur Hope College of Technology (now known as the Government College of Technology, Coimbatore), was started by G.D. Naidu in 1945 followed later by private engineering colleges PSG College of Technology, and Coimbatore Institute of Technology in the 1950s. The Air Force Administrative College, established in 1949, is the oldest training institute of the Indian Air Force. Coimbatore Medical College was opened in 1966 and also city has another Government run ESIC Medical College, Coimbatore. The Government law college started functioning from 1978. The agricultural school established in 1868 was converted into a full-fledged agricultural university. Tamil Nadu Agricultural University in 1971 and the Sálim Ali Centre for Ornithology and Natural History was opened in 1990.

, the district is home to seven universities, 78 engineering colleges, 3 medical colleges, 2 dental colleges, 35 polytechnics and 150 arts and science colleges. The city houses three government run universities Tamil Nadu Agricultural University, Bharathiar University, Anna University Coimbatore and four private universities. The city houses headquarters of renowned multi-campus, multi-disciplinary private deemed university, Amrita Vishwa Vidyapeetham. The city houses Government research institutes including the Central Institute for Cotton Research, Sugarcane Breeding Research Institute, Institute of Forest Genetics and Tree Breeding (IFGTB), Indian Council of Forestry Research and Education and Tamil Nadu Institute of Urban Studies. In 2008, Government of India announced a plan to establish a world class university in the region.

Three types of schools operate in Coimbatore: government run schools, schools funded by the government but run by private trusts (aided schools) and schools funded completely by private trusts. Schools were following Tamil Nadu Anglo Indian School Board like Stanes and St Francis, Tamil Nadu State Board, Matriculation, CBSE or ICSE / ISC syllabus. Samacheer Kalvi (Tamil: சமச்சீர் கல்வி) or Tamil Nadu Uniform System of School Education or Equitable education system was introduced by the Tamil Nadu Uniform System of School Education Act 2010 to integrate the various school educational systems within the state. Several schools in the city have moved on from Anglo Indian and Matriculation systems to CBSE and ICSE/ISC syllabus. The city falls under the purview of Coimbatore Education District. In 2013, 45,863 students appeared for SSLC examinations and the pass percentage was 94.12%.

Utility services

Media 

Four major English newspapers The Hindu, The Times of India, Deccan Chronicle and The New Indian Express bring out editions from the city. Business Line, a business newspaper also brings out a Coimbatore edition. Tamil newspapers which have Coimbatore editions include Dinamalar, Dina Thanthi, Dinamani, Dinakaran, Tamil Murasu and Maalai Malar (both evening newspapers). Two Malayalam newspapers – Malayala Manorama and Mathrubhumi also have considerable circulation in the city. Lotus News is headquartered in Coimbatore.

A Medium wave radio station is operated by All India Radio, with programs in Tamil, English and Hindi. Five FM radio stations operate from Coimbatore – Rainbow FM, Suryan FM, Radio Mirchi, Radio City and Hello FM. All these private radio stations air exclusively Tamil based programs, including film music. Television relay started in 1985 from Delhi Doordarshan and in 1986, after inception of the repeater tower at Kodaikanal, telecast from Madras commenced.  In 2005, Doordarshan opened its studio in Coimbatore. Television services are accessible through DTH or digital cable.

Telecommunication 
Coimbatore has a well-connected communications infrastructure. Till the 1990s the state owned Bharat Sanchar Nigam Limited (BSNL) was the only telecommunication service provider in the city. In the 1990s, private telecom companies too started offering their services. , BSNL, Reliance Communications, Bharti Airtel, Tata Communications, Tata Teleservices, Reliance Jio and ACT offer broadband service and fixed line services. MTS offers mobile broadband services. Cellular telephony was first introduced in 1997 and mobile telephone services available. Coimbatore is the headquarters of the Tamil Nadu circle of cellular service providers.

Healthcare 
There are around 750 hospitals in the city with an in-patient capacity of 5,000 beds. These hospitals include Single Speciality institutions like eye care clinics such as The Eye Foundation, Aravind & Sankara Nethralya, kidney center, ortho center, etc. and also multi special hospitals. The first health care centre in the city was started in 1909. In 1969, it was upgraded to Coimbatore Medical College Hospital and also city has government run ESI Hospital, which was renovated recently at Rs. 5.20 billion with 500 beds. A government run tertiary care hospital with 1020 beds and provides free health care. The city corporation maintains 16 dispensaries and two maternity homes. People from nearby districts and the state of Kerala visit Coimbatore for medical tourism due to the availability of hospitals and healthcare facilities.

Sports and recreation 

Coimbatore is often referred to as "India's Motorsports Hub" and the "Backyard of Indian Motorsports". S.Karivardhan designed and built entry – level race cars and the Kari Motor Speedway, a Formula 3 Category circuit, is named after him. Tyre manufacturer MRF assembles Formula Ford cars in Coimbatore in association with former F3 Champion J. Anand and racing company Super Speeds designs Formula cars. Rallying is another major event with rallies conducted in closed roads around Coimbatore. Narain Karthikeyan, India's first Formula One driver hails from the city, and other motorsport drivers from Coimbatore include J. Anand and V. R. Naren Kumar.

Nehru Stadium, built originally for football, also hosts athletic meets. The stadium has been renovated with Korean grass for the field and a synthetic track around it for athletics. Apart from the stadium, other sporting venues include the Coimbatore Golf Course, an 18 – hole golf course and Coimbatore Cosmopolitan Club, which is more than 100 years old. Coimbatore Flying Club is located in the Coimbatore Airport premises. The city hosts its own annual marathon called Coimbatore Marathon as an event to raise cancer awareness. Retired tennis player Nirupama Vaidyanathan, who became the first Indian woman in the modern era to feature and win a round at a main draw Grand Slam in 1998 Australian Open hails from Coimbatore. Coimbatore District Chess Association (CDCA), established in 1940, is the oldest chess association in the country.

City based teams

Recreation 

There are several amusement parks around the city: Black Thunder water theme park near Mettupalayam, Kovai Kondattam amusement park at Perur and Maharaja Theme Park at Neelambur.
 Since the 1980s, the city has had a few small shopping complexes and major shopping malls include Prozone Mall, Brookefields Mall and Fun Republic Mall. The city also has a number of parks including the VOC Park, the Tamil Nadu Agricultural University Park, Race Course Children's Park and Bharathi Park in Saibaba Colony. Coimbatore Zoo houses a number of animals and birds and is located near VOC Park. The grounds are used for conducting fairs and events including the annual Independence day and Republic day celebrations. Singanallur Lake is a popular tourist place and bird watcher destination. Popular cinemas include KG Cinemas, The Cinema by SPI Cinemas, Cinépolis, INOX and Miraj Cinemas.

Environmental issues 
Air pollution, lack of proper waste management infrastructure and degradation of water bodies are the major environmental issues in Coimbatore. There is a sewage treatment plant at Ukkadam with the capacity to process 70 million litres of sewage water per day. Garbage is collected by the corporation and sewage is pumped into the water tanks and the Noyyal River through streams. This along with garbage dumping and encroachments has led to degradation of the water bodies and depletion in the groundwater table. The tanks are renovated by the city's environmental groups with their own fund-raising and the corporation. The corporation is responsible and involved in clearing encroachment of the tanks. Siruthuli, an environmental organisation founded by the city's industrial houses, undertakes de-silting of tanks and cleaning of the Noyyal river. Environment Conservation Group based out of the city is also involved in conservation of trees and wetlands, monitoring wildlife crime and conducting awareness sessions for students.

Notable people 

 Kovai Gnani, Tamil writer
 Vishnu Jejjala (born 1975), Indian-American physicist
 Narain Karthikeyan (born 1977), formula racing driver
 Mohammed Saleem, Environmental Activist
 K. G. Lakshminarayan (born 31 March 1953), former cricket umpire
 Tiruvadi Sambasiva Venkataraman (born June 1884), botanist
 Sadhguru Jaggi Vasudev (born 3 September 1957), author, spiritual leader 
 Sivakumar (born 1941), Indian visual artist and former actor
 D. Sreeram Kumar (born 1981), Indian Army officer
 Suriya ( born 1975), Indian actor, producer, television presenter
 Sathyaraj (born 1954), Indian actor, producer, director and a media personality

International relations 
Coimbatore has sister city relationship with Toledo, Ohio. The relation has enabled exchange in the fields of arts and education between the cities. A twin city pact with the German city of Esslingen was signed in July 2016 enabling the two cities to collaborate on areas of mutual interest, health, education, culture and social development.

Alliance Française de Madras, a Franco-Indian non-profit association promoting the growth of French in India has a centre at PSG Institute of Management in Coimbatore.

See also 
 Coimbatore metropolitan area
 Coimbatore district
 List of neighbourhoods of Coimbatore
 Siruvani
 Adiyogi Shiva statue
 Velliangiri Mountains
 Maruthamalai Marudhachalamurthy Temple
 Aliyar Reservoir
 Athikadavu-Avinashi Scheme

Notes

References

External links 

 
 Coimbatore Municipal Corporation Website
 

 
Smart cities in India
Metropolitan cities in India
Cities and towns in Coimbatore district